Jochen Förster (born 7 November 1942, in Zwickau) was an East German (now German) retired slalom canoeist who competed in the 1960s and 1970s. He won three medals in the C-1 team event at the ICF Canoe Slalom World Championships with a gold in 1971, a silver in 1967 and a bronze in 1965. He also finished fourth in the C-1 event at the 1972 Summer Olympics in Munich.

References
 

1942 births
Living people
People from Zwickau
Canoeists at the 1972 Summer Olympics
German male canoeists
Olympic canoeists of East Germany
Medalists at the ICF Canoe Slalom World Championships
Sportspeople from Saxony